Anton Botev (born May 25, 1986) is an amateur Azerbaijani Greco-Roman wrestler, who played for the men's super heavyweight category. He is a member of Neftçi Wrestling Club in Baku, and is coached and trained by Timershan Kalimulin.

Botev represented his current nation Azerbaijan at the 2008 Summer Olympics in Beijing, where he competed for the men's 120 kg class. He first defeated Georgian-born Uzbek wrestler and former heavyweight silver medalist David Saldadze in the qualifying round, before losing out his next match to Sweden's Jalmar Sjöberg, who was able to score five points in two straight periods, leaving Botev without a single point.

References

External links
Profile – International Wrestling Database
NBC Olympics Profile

Russian male sport wrestlers
Azerbaijani male sport wrestlers
1986 births
Living people
Olympic wrestlers of Azerbaijan
Wrestlers at the 2008 Summer Olympics
Sportspeople from Omsk
Azerbaijani people of Russian descent